Villacidro  (Sardinian: Biddacidru or Bidda de Cidru) is a town and comune in the province of South Sardinia, Sardinia, Italy. In 2005 it has been the administrative seat of the province 'Medio Campidano', together with Sanluri. Since 2016 it is part of the province of South Sardinia ('provincia Sud Sardegna').

History

Geography
Villacidro borders the municipalities of Domusnovas (CI), Gonnosfanadiga, Iglesias (CI), San Gavino Monreale, Sanluri, Serramanna, Vallermosa (CA) and Villasor (CA).

References

External links

Cities and towns in Sardinia